Clark L. Swisher (March 27, 1916 – November 28, 2005) was an American football and basketball coach. He served as the head football coach at Northern State University in Aberdeen, South Dakota from 1946 and 1955 and from 1957 to 1968, compiling a record of 146–42–4. Swisher was also the head basketball coach at Northern State from 1946 to 1955, tallying a mark of 95–88. Swisher died on November 28, 2005, at a hospital in Wessington Springs, South Dakota.

Head coaching record

College football

References

1916 births
2005 deaths
Basketball coaches from South Dakota
Basketball players from South Dakota
College men's basketball head coaches in the United States
Northern State Wolves football coaches
Northern State Wolves men's basketball coaches
South Dakota Coyotes football players
South Dakota Coyotes men's basketball players
High school football coaches in South Dakota
People from Vermillion, South Dakota
Players of American football from South Dakota